UNAH Library System at Universidad Nacional Autónoma de Honduras, founded in 1968, is a free support for students, teachers and researchers.

History

UNAH Library began as the library for CURN in 1970, but later was renamed UNAH Library. Every campus of UNAH has its own library that forms part of the library system.

Services and collections

In total figures, the Library has more than 100,000 books, 5,000 electronic books and 30,000 paper magazines.

UNAH libraries in Tegucigalpa

The library system of UNAH is composed of three parts:

Central library in university city campus (Tegucigalpa)
Small libraries that belong to every faculty
Medical library in school of medicine

Central library

The central library is located in the administrative building, at the center of university city in Tegucigalpa, it is composed of six rooms:

General collection
Honduran collection
Reference
Reserve
Hemeroteca
Internet room

Central library is in the same building of learning source center (CRA), which has movies, films, and rooms for presentation and exhibitions.

See also

 Universidad Nacional Autónoma de Honduras
 Oviatt Library
 University College Dublin Library

References

External links
 
  Browser of UNAH library

Academic libraries
Libraries in Honduras